Karen Foxlee (born 1971) is an Australian novelist.

Life and career
After training and working as a nurse for most of her adult life, she graduated from the University of the Sunshine Coast with a Bachelor of Arts degree in 2005, in creative writing. Her first novel The Anatomy of Wings was originally published in 2008, by the University of Queensland Press, and has since been published in the United States, the United Kingdom and Canada.

Awards and nominations
 2006: Queensland Premier's Literary Award (Best emerging author)
 2008: Commonwealth Writers' Prize (Best First Book in the South East Asia and South Pacific Region) for The Anatomy of Wings
 2008: Dobbie Encouragement Award for The Anatomy of Wings
 2014: Davitt Award for The Midnight Dress
 2019: Griffith University Young Adult Book Award for Lenny’s Book of Everything
2020: New South Wales Premier's Literary Awards Ethel Turner Prize for Young People's Literature for Lenny's Book of Everything
2022: Indie Books Award Children's Book, shortlisted for Dragon Skin
2022: CBCA Children's Book of the Year Award: Younger Readers, shortlisted for Dragon Skin
2022: New South Wales Premier's Literary Awards Patricia Wrightson Prize for Children's Literature for Dragon Skin
2022: Prime Minister's Literary Award for Australian history, shortlisted for Dragon Skin

Works
 The Anatomy of Wings (2008)
 The Midnight Dress (2013)
 Ophelia and the Marvelous Boy (2014)
 A Most Magical Girl (2016)
Lenny's Book of Everything (2018)
Dragon Skin (2021)

References

External links

Reviews 

1971 births
21st-century Australian novelists
Australian women novelists
People from Mount Isa
Living people
Writers from Queensland
21st-century Australian women writers